Neil Vartan (19 January 1962 in Woolwich – 17 October 1994 in Uttlesford) was an English cricketer. He was a right-handed batsman and wicket-keeper who played for Hertfordshire.

Vartan, who made his debut for Durham University in 1982, played for Hertfordshire in the Minor Counties Championship between 1988 and 1989. Earlier in the decade he played for the cricket team of the Royal Anglian Regiment, including in a match against Felsted – his old school. 

Vartan made his only List A appearance in the 1990 NatWest Trophy, against Warwickshire, scoring 10 runs.

References

External links
Neil Vartan at Cricket Archive

1962 births
1994 deaths
English cricketers
Hertfordshire cricketers
Alumni of Durham University
People educated at Felsted School